Escadrille Spa.69 (originally named Escadrille N.69) was a French fighter squadron derived from one of its military's oldest aviation units. Active from September 1915 until the 11 November 1918 Armistice, the escadrille campaigned on both the Western and Italian Fronts with X Armee. It was credited with 38 aerial combat victories.

History
Escadrille Spa.69 had its origins in one of France's oldest military aviation units; BL C5 was an observation unit flying Bleriots that was attached to the cavalry. Personnel were drawn from BL C5 in September 1915 to form Escadrille N. 69, which was equipped with Nieuport fighters.

The squadron was posted to X Armee. On 28 February 1916, the escadrille moved to the Battle of Verdun. They returned to X Armee in July.

When the squadron had notched 20 aerial victories, it was Mentioned in dispatches. On 28 October 1917, the squadron accompanied X Armee to the Italian theater of operations. While in Italy, the squadron was re-equipped with SPAD fighters, changing its name to Escadrille Spa.69.

The newly outfitted squadron accompanied X Armee in its return to the Western Front, transferring on 26 March 1918. On 30 September 1918, Escadrille Spa.69 was Mentioned in dispatches a second time, credited with destruction of 34 enemy aircraft. This second citation gave the unit the right to display the Fourragere of the Croix de Guerre.

By the Armistice, Escadrille Spa.69 was credited with destroying 38 enemy aircraft.

Commanding officers
 Capitaine Robert Massenet-Royer de Marancour: Until 25 January 1917.
 Lieutenant Paul Malavialle: 25 January 1917 until war's end.

Notable members
 Major Fernand Bonneton
 Capitaine Paul Malavialle
 Lieutenant Honoré de Bonald
 Sergeant Paul Rodde

Aircraft

 Blériot observation aircraft while still BL C5
 Nieuport fighters: September 1915
 SPAD fighters: c. November 1917 until war's end

End notes

Reference
 Franks, Norman; Bailey, Frank (1993). Over the Front: The Complete Record of the Fighter Aces and Units of the United States and French Air Services, 1914–1918 London, UK: Grub Street Publishing. .

Fighter squadrons of the French Air and Space Force
Military units and formations established in 1915
Military units and formations disestablished in 1918
Military units and formations of France in World War I
Military aviation units and formations in World War I